The 2015 Moscow ePrix, formally known as the 2015 Formula E Moscow ePrix, was a Formula E motor race that took place on 6 June 2015 on Moscow Street Circuit in Moscow, Russia. It was the ninth round of the 2014–15 Formula E season.

Background
On 3 February 2015, it was announced that the newly founded Formula E, a class of auto racing for one-make, single-seater, electrically powered racing cars, was set to race in Moscow on a street circuit near the Kremlin, on the north bank of the Moskva River.

Coming into the race from Berlin a fortnight earlier, Nelson Piquet Jr. was leading the championship on 103, with Sébastien Buemi second 2 points behind. They had both jumped Lucas di Grassi, who was disqualified from the Berlin race for having an illegal front wing. Di Grassi sits third on 93 points. The win was inherited by Jérôme d'Ambrosio, who sits in fifth on 77 points, one point behind Nicolas Prost.

Report

Sessions
All sessions took place on Saturday, 6 June 2015.

Fan Boost
Nelson Piquet Jr., Sébastien Buemi and Lucas di Grassi won the Fan Boost. It was Piquet's fourth boost in a row, second in a row for Buemi, and second overall for di Grassi. It was the first for di Grassi since the season opener, and the first time the top 3 in the championship took the Fan Boost advantage.

Results

Qualifying

 – Breach of parc ferme rules, excluded.

Race

Notes:
 - Three points for pole position.
 - Two points for fastest lap.
 - Sebastian Buemi received a drive through penalty converted into a 29-second penalty for an unsafe pit stop release.
 - Loic Duval received a drive through penalty converted into a 29-seconds time penalty for causing a collision.

Standings after the race
Drivers or teams listed in bold were still able to take the respective title.

Drivers' Championship standings

Constructors' Championship standings

 Note: Only the top five positions are included for both sets of standings.

References

External links

|- style="text-align:center"
|width="35%"|Previous race:2015 Berlin ePrix
|width="30%"|FIA Formula E Championship2014–15 season
|width="35%"|Next race:2015 London ePrix
|- style="text-align:center"
|width="35%"|Previous race:N/A
|width="30%"|Moscow ePrix
|width="35%"|Next race:N/A
|- style="text-align:center"

Moscow ePrix
Moscow ePrix
Moscow ePrix